Robert "Robbie" Mulhern (born 18 October 1994) is a professional rugby league footballer who plays as a  for the Leigh Leopards in the Super League. Mulhern has represented Ireland, England and the England Knights at international level.

He has previously played for the Leeds Rhinos in the Super League, and on loan from Leeds at the Hunslet Hawks in the Kingstone Press Championship. Mulhern also played for the Warrington Wolves and Hull Kingston Rovers in the Super League and the Championship, and on loan from Hull KR at the Newcastle Thunder in League 1.

Background
Mulhern was born in Leeds, West Yorkshire, England.

Early career
As a junior he played for the Castleford Panthers, Normanton Knights and he spent time in the Wakefield Trinity Wildcats' Academy System.

Senior career

Leeds Rhinos 
Mulhern made only five appearances for the Leeds Rhinos during 2014 and 2015.

Hunslet Hawks 
Mulhern was loaned to the Hunslet Hawks in the 2015 rugby league season. He made twenty appearances and scored two tries.

Hull Kingston Rovers 
Mulhern joined Hull Kingston Rovers ahead of the 2016 Super League season. Mulhern suffered relegation from the Super League with Hull Kingston Rovers in the 2016 season, due to losing the Million Pound Game by the Salford Red Devils.

12-months later however, Mulhern was part of the Hull Kingston Rovers' side that won promotion back to the Super League, at the first time of asking following relegation the season prior. It was revealed on 1 May 2018, that Mulhern had signed a new long-term contract, to remain at Hull Kingston Rovers until at least the end of the 2021 rugby league season.

Warrington Wolves 
In was announced on 10 December 2020 that Mulhern would be joining Warrington in a two-year swap deal with Luis Johnson for the 2021 season.

Leigh
On 20 October 2022, it was announced that Mulhern had signed a contract to join the newly promoted Leigh side.

International career

Ireland 
Mulhern is an Ireland international.

England 
It was revealed on 16 October 2018, that Mulhern would be making his England début as an interchange against France on 17 October 2018, in a Test match at the Leigh Sports Village.

England defeated the French 44-6, with Mulhern making an appearance from off the bench.

England Knights 
Following Mulhern's exceptional season for Hull Kingston Rovers, it was revealed by the Rugby Football League on 24 July 2018, that Mulhern had been added to the 25-man England Knights' Performance Squad, that would be touring Papua New Guinea for a two-game Test match series later in the year.

In 2018 he was selected for the England Knights on their tour of Papua New Guinea, and Mulhern would be linking-up with his then Hull Kingston Rovers teammate Chris Atkin, who was already previously announced within the Knights' fold.

Mulhern made his début for the England Knights against Papua New Guinea on 27 October 2018, the game played in Lae ended in a 12-16 victory to the Knights. He played against Papua New Guinea at the Oil Search National Football Stadium.

Honours

Career Awards and Accolades

Hull Kingston Rovers
2018: 'Young Player of the Year Award'

References

External links

Warrington Wolves profile
Hull KR profile
SL profile
Ireland profile

1994 births
Living people
England Knights national rugby league team players
England national rugby league team players
English people of Irish descent
English rugby league players
Hull Kingston Rovers players
Hunslet R.L.F.C. players
Ireland national rugby league team players
Leeds Rhinos players
Leigh Leopards players
Newcastle Thunder players
Rugby league players from Leeds
Rugby league props
Warrington Wolves players